Rally for the Monegasque Family (French: Rassemblement pour la Famille Monégasque), also known as Promotion of the Monegasque Family (French: Promotion de la Famille Monégasque) was a Royalist political party in the Principality of Monaco. Founded in 1998, as Rally for the Monegasque Family (RFM), and led by Jacques Rit, RFM joined the centrist coalition Union for Monaco (UM) in 2003. However, RFM and UM severed ties preceding the 2008 parliamentary elections, and RFM formed a center-right coalition Monaco Together (ME). Rit later joined Horizon Monaco in the 2013 Monegasque general election.

References

Defunct political parties in Monaco
Monarchist parties in Monaco
Monegasque nationalism
1998 establishments in Monaco
Political parties established in 1998
Political parties disestablished in 2013